Naziha Arebi is a Libyan-British director, producer, writer and artist who was born in 1984 to an English mother and Libyan father and was raised in Hastings. She is well-recognized for directing and producing award-winning Freedom Fields, which premiered at the 2018 Toronto International Film Festival (TIFF), and other movie projects. Her photography and writing has also been published in multiple newspapers and magazines. Naziha's films have been shown at multiple more film festivals, including Arab Film Festival USA, Edinburgh International Film Festival, Venice International Film Festival, and the Tripoli Film Festival. Her writings and photography have also been published in multiple magazines and newspapers. She also works with many organizations such as UN Women and BBC Media Action.

Filmography 

 Freedom Fields
 After A Revolution

References

Living people
British film directors
Year of birth missing (living people)